Andrey Svintsov (born 12 November 1978, Moscow) is a Russian political figure and a deputy of the 6th, 7th and 8th State Dumas.

While studying at the Moscow State University of Environmental Engineering, Svitsov was a specialist of the first category, a leading specialist in the central hydrochemical laboratory. In 2000, he started working as a junior researcher at the State Center for Water Management Monitoring of the Ministry of Natural Resources and Environment. The same year, Svintsov joined the Liberal Democratic Party of Russia (LDPR). From 2004 to 2008, he was an advisor to the first deputy head of the LDPR faction in the 4th State Duma Maksim Rokhmistrov. In 2008, Svintsov became the assistant to the deputy chairman of the 5th State Duma Vladimir Zhirinovsky. In 2011 and 2016, he was elected deputy of the 6th and 7th State Dumas, respectively. In 2021, he was not elected to the 8th Duma according to the results of the elections.
 However, after Zhirinovsky's death in April 2022, Svintsov received his vacant Duma mandate on 1 June 2022, and took up his seat in the 8th convocation.

Sanctions
In December 2022 the EU sanctioned Andrey Svintsov in relation to the 2022 Russian invasion of Ukraine.

References

 

1978 births
Living people
Liberal Democratic Party of Russia politicians
21st-century Russian politicians
Sixth convocation members of the State Duma (Russian Federation)
Seventh convocation members of the State Duma (Russian Federation)
Eighth convocation members of the State Duma (Russian Federation)